Umbonella sismondae is a species of sea snail, a marine gastropod mollusk in the family Trochidae, the top snails.

Description
The height of the shell attains 4 mm, its diameter also 4 mm. The small, imperforate, greenish shell has a conoid shape. It contains minute, transverse striae. The apex is obtuse. The 4 whorls increase slowly in size. They are slightly convex and have a distinct suture. The body whorl takes up half of the total length. Its base is angulated and shows on its lower parts four concentric ribs. The oblique aperture is subcircular.

Distribution
This species occurs in the Red Sea on coral reefs.

References

sismondae
Gastropods described in 1869